The women's 500 metres races of the 2013–14 ISU Speed Skating World Cup 3, arranged in the Alau Ice Palace, in Astana, Kazakhstan, were held on 29 and 30 November 2013.

Lee Sang-hwa of South Korea won both races, extending her winning streak from the start of the season to six races. As the Alau Ice Palace is a low-altitude venue, she was not able to break the world record again, which she had done in the previous three races, but in the Friday race, she did skate the fastest time recorded on any rink outside Calgary and Salt Lake City with a time of 37.27 seconds.

In race one, Jenny Wolf of Germany came second, and Nao Kodaira of Japan came third, while Lee Bo-ra of South Korea won the Division B race.

In race two, Lee was again accompanied on the podium by Wolf in second place, but Olga Fatkulina of Russia took third place here. Annette Gerritsen of the Netherlands won the second Division B race.

Race 1
Race one took place on Friday, 29 November, with Division B in the afternoon session, scheduled at 13:30, and Division A scheduled in the evening session, at 18:00.

Division A

Division B

Race 2
Race two took place on Saturday, 30 November, with Division B scheduled in the afternoon session, at 13:30, and Division A scheduled in the evening session, at 17:30.

Division A

Division B

References

Women 0500
3